Piz de Trescolmen is a mountain of the Lepontine Alps, situated in the canton of Graubünden, Switzerland. It has several summits: the highest at 2,652 metres and the southern at 2,581 metres. On its southern side it overlooks the Trescolmen Pass (2,161 m).

References

External links
 Piz de Trescolmen on Hikr

Mountains of Graubünden
Mountains of the Alps
Lepontine Alps
Mountains of Switzerland
Two-thousanders of Switzerland